Bharananganam, an important pilgrimage centre in South India, is located on the banks of the Meenachil River,  away from Pala and  from Plassanal, in Kottayam district in the state of Kerala. Bharananganam and surrounding places are hilly areas with a lot of vegetation. Agriculture is the main occupation of the people, who cultivate plantation crops such as rubber.

Demographics
The population of Bharananganam comprises Catholic Syrian Christians and Hindus. The Syrian Christian community here is said to be 1000 years old, who migrated from kodungallur and palayoor, in the tenth and 11th centuries. Also, many other Christian families migrated to the region from other ancient Christian centers like Nilakkal, Aruvithura, and Kaduthuruthi in the following centuries. The community traditionally practices farming. Both the Christians and Hindus live in absolute peace and harmony.

History
Bharananganam is known for its many aristocratic and affluent Nasrani families who've branched out from the place to other agrarian areas of Kerala, following the early agrarian expansion of Central Travancore, in the mid-19th century. This expansion lasted until the 1980s, with the last few waves of migrant Syrian Christians from in and around the area, migrating to the hilly villages of highrange and Malabar.Bharananganam is relevant to Nasrani history. The ancient church which was on South Bank of meenachil river was burnt and the church was shifted to North bank of the river.

Other major attractions

Sree Krishna Swami Temple 

Bharananaganam is well known for Sree Krishna Temple in the banks of river Meenachil, it is one of the major temples of South Kerala. The eight-day long annual festival in Makaram (January) is a very vibrant event in the whole region commencing with the hoisting of the temple flag on Makara Samkramam day, and concluding with ‘Arattu’ (Ritual Bath of the deity) on the eighth day. Besides the regular daily rituals the festivities include processions of the deity on elephant's back to the suburban villages like Kizhaparayar, Keezhambara, Chittanappara and Bharananganam (on five days) the precious ‘Utsava Bali’ (for six days) and art and cultural programs every day. The ‘Arattu’, typical of the 'Arattu' in almost any temple, is a magnificent night-long ceremony including procession of several elephants and performances by major percussion teams. The slow-moving procession of the caparisoned elephants carrying decorative silken umbrellas and other paraphernalia, illumined by multi-tongued oil torches, is a gorgeous spectacle, a delightful experience for the participants.

Assisi Ashram 
Assisi ashramam, run by Order of Friars Minor Capuchin (OFM Cap.) missionaries, is also situated here. This Renewal Centre has completed 34 years of praiseworthy service in providing spiritual assistance to numerous people. The first Malayalam Charismatic retreat was conducted here. This Renewal Centre publishes a Malayalam magazine named Assisi and they manage a publishing house named Jeevan Books.

Educational institutions 
Bharananganam is famous for its elite institutions.

 St.Joseph's College of Engineering and Technology
  Alphonsa Residential School (ARSB) is the first ICSE syllabus school in Kerala and is named after Saint Alphonsa
 Sacred Heart Girls High School 
 St. Mary's Boys High School
 Assisi, Institute of Foreign Languages: German, English, French, Italian(www.assisiinstitute.org)

Saint Alphonsa's tomb 
This small town is known as the Lisieux of India after the birthplace of St Thérèse of Lisieux in France. The thousand year old St Mary's Syro-Malabar Catholic Church here is one of the famous pilgrim centers of the St Thomas Christians in Kerala. St Alphonsa is the first woman to be conferred sainthood from the Kerala Church, which traces its origins to the evangelism of Thomas the Apostle around 2,000 years ago, and the second Indian to sainted after Gonsalo Garcia, a Luso-Indian born in Portuguese Bombay and Bassein. The death anniversary of St Alphonsa, which falls on 28 July is an important day for the devotees. Every year on this day, thousands of devotees visit this holy shrine, where the mortal remains of the saint is preserved, to pray and seek her blessings.

St Alphonsa lived a godly life and was recognised as a such during her lifetime. Even at a young age she showed a great zeal for suffering and she used to pray fervently and longed for sacrifice and fasting as and when possible. She believed that she must endure all things that tests her will and offer them to the Lord. It is said that in spite of her painful diseases, she was cheerful to the last. It was her students who established the cult of St Alphonsa at first. After her death, they began visiting her tomb and making votive offerings of candles and flowers. The visits continued and multiplied, as they devotees began receiving favours. Ever since, her tomb has become a centre of pilgrimage and countless miracles. The first officially confirmed miracle was that of, a disabled child miraculously cured of his ailment clubbed feet, attributed to the intercession of the saint, after prayer at the altar of Sr Alphonsa's shrine. The miracle was approved in 1985 and the beatification of Sister Alphonsa was proclaimed by Pope John Paul II, during his visit to India in 1986. There is a two floored structure in front of the shrine which was originally the Papal podium for the beatification ceremony on 8 Feb.1986. 
Sister Alphonsa became Saint Alphonsa after she was canonised by Pope Benedict XVI at a ceremony at St. Peter's Square, Vatican City on 12 October 2008. 
The Clarist convent where Sr. Alphonsa lived is located near St. Mary's Syro-Malabar Catholic Forane Church in Bharananganam. There is a museum adjacent to the convent chapel where the personal belongings of the Saint are well preserved.

Accessibility
Nearest airport - Cochin International Airport - 
Nearest railway station - Kottayam - 
Distance to Cochin/Ernakulam  - 
Distance to Kottayam - 
Distance to Pala/Palai - 
Distance to Thiruvananthapuram - 
Distance to Keezhampara -

References

External links
Bharananganam Temple website

Villages in Kottayam district